New Wave Blues is the debut studio album by the Wandas, independently released in 2009.

Track listing
 "New Wave Blues" – 4:39  McEachern / Battey
 "Bending Over Backwards" – 4:07  McEachern
 "Thank You Note" – 4:08  McEachern
 "Please Come Home" – 3:53  McEachern
 "Everyday (is as bad as monday)" - 4:43*  McEachern / Battey 
 "Trepidation" – 4:11 McEachern / Battey / Lucivero / McElholm 
 "1 in 4" – 3:20 McEachern / Battey / Lucivero / McElholm 
 "Fighting a War" – 4:11  McEachern 
 "The Lady" – 4:09 McEachern / Battey 
 "Lose You – 6:16 McEachern
 "Better Now" – 4:28 McEachern

Videos
A music video was released for "Thank You Note", featuring upwards of 200 fans, family, and friends all singing the lyrics to the song. The video was successful and viewed tens of thousands of times. The video for "Thank You Note" was featured on Fuse TV on demand in July 2009.

Personnel
Keith McEachern - Lead vocals, guitar, synth, keys, piano, glockenspiel, percussion, sequencing
Brent Battey - Guitar, background vocals
Ross Lucivero - Bass guitar, background vocals
Pete McElholm -  Drums, percussion, sequencing
Erica Mazaika - Additional Vocals on "Better Now"
Patrick Krief - Producer, additional guitars, synth, piano, tambourine, background vocals
J. Saliba -  Engineer
Ryan Morey - Mastering
Brenda Van der Merwe - Violin
Dimitar Petkov - Viola
Leo Eguchi - Cello
Matt Kane- Tenor saxophone
Jeff Lizotte  - Trumpet

References

2009 debut albums
The Wandas albums